The Vuelta ciclista al Táchira (English: Tour of Táchira) is a multi-day road bicycle racing stage race held annually each January since 1966 in the state of Táchira in western Venezuela. The Vuelta al Táchira is part of the UCI America Tour, which is one of six UCI Continental Circuits sponsored by the Union Cycliste Internationale, which is the sport's international governing body, and the Venezuelan Cycling Federation. This event takes place during the Festival of Saint Sebastian which dates back to colonial times.

Past winners

External links
  

 
Cycle races in Venezuela
UCI America Tour races
Recurring sporting events established in 1966
1966 establishments in Venezuela